These are the matches that Valencia CF have played in European football competitions.

European Cup / UEFA Champions League

European Cup Winners' Cup

UEFA Cup / UEFA Europa League

Intertoto Cup

European Super Cup/UEFA Super Cup

Inter-Cities Fairs Cup

Finals

Overall record
Last update: 10 March 2020
{| class="wikitable sortable" style="text-align:center"
|-
!Competition!!Pld!!W!!D!!L!!GF!!GA!!GD
|-
|align=left|European Cup/Champions League
|128||57||35||36||191||130||+61
|-
|align=left|Cup Winners' Cup
|19||10||5||4||39||20||+19
|-
|align=left|UEFA Cup/Europa League
|133||65||36||32||226||145||+81
|-
|align=left|Fairs Cup
|52||29||10||12||112||67||+35
|-
|align=left|Super Cup
|3||2||0||1||4||3||+1
|-
|align=left|Intertoto Cup
|12||7||3||2||17||4||+13
|-
!
Total
!347||171||90||87||589||369||+220|}

Honours
UEFA Champions LeagueRunners-up: 1999–2000, 2000–01Quarter-finals: 2002–03, 2006–07

UEFA Cup Winners' Cup
Winners: 1979–80Quarter-finals: 1967–68

UEFA Cup / UEFA Europa League
Winners: 2003–04Semi-finals: 2011–12, 2013–14, 2018–19Quarter-finals: 1981–82, 1982–83, 1996–97, 2001–02, 2009–10
UEFA Super Cup
Winners: 1980, 2004

UEFA Intertoto Cup
Winners: 1998Runners-up: 2005

Fairs Cup
Winners: 1961–62, 1962–63Runners-up:'' 1963–64

Succession Boxes

References

Europe
Spanish football clubs in international competitions